Unha station is a railway station in Manp'o municipal city, Chagang province, North Korea. It is the terminus of the Unha Line of the Korean State Railway.

History

The station was opened on 1 February 1939 by the Chosen Government Railway, along with the rest of the last section of the Manp'o Line from Kanggye to Manp'o.

References

Railway stations in North Korea